Teldenia is a genus of moths belonging to the subfamily Drepaninae.

Species
species group niveata:
Teldenia alba Moore, 1882
Teldenia niveata Pagenstecher, 1896
Teldenia obsoleta Warren, 1896
Teldenia specca Wilkinson, 1967
Teldenia vestigiata Butler, 1880
species group nigrinotata:
Teldenia apata Wilkinson, 1967
Teldenia aurilinea Warren, 1922
Teldenia celidographia Wilkinson, 1967
Teldenia desma Wilkinson, 1967
Teldenia geminata Warren, 1922
Teldenia helena Wilkinson, 1967
Teldenia illunata Warren, 1907
Teldenia inanis Wilkinson, 1967
Teldenia latilinea Watson, 1961
Teldenia melanosticta Wilkinson, 1967
Teldenia moniliata Warren, 1902
Teldenia nigrinotata Warren, 1896
Teldenia psara Wilkinson, 1967
Teldenia sparsata Wilkinson, 1967
species group pura:
Teldenia argeta Wilkinson, 1967
Teldenia cathara Wilkinson, 1967
Teldenia nivea Butler, 1887
Teldenia pura Warren, 1899
Teldenia unistrigata Warren, 1896
species group strigosa:
Teldenia ruficosta Warren, 1922
Teldenia seriata Warren, 1922
Teldenia strigosa Warren, 1903
Teldenia subpura Rothschild, 1915

Former species
 Teldenia fulvilunata Warren, 1897

References

Drepaninae
Drepanidae genera
Taxa named by Frederic Moore